Nenad Mladenović (Serbian Cyrillic: Ненад Младеновић; born 13 December 1976) is a Serbian former professional footballer who played as a striker.

Club career
Mladenović made a name for himself while playing for Obilić from 2000 to 2003, scoring 26 league goals in 73 appearances. He also played professionally in Ukraine, Belgium, Libya and China.

International career
Mladenović was capped once for the national team of FR Yugoslavia, making his debut on 13 February 2002 in a friendly match against Mexico.

Statistics

External links
 
 
 

1976 births
Living people
Sportspeople from Kragujevac
Serbian footballers
Association football forwards
Serbia and Montenegro international footballers
FK Obilić players
FC Metalurh Donetsk players
K.A.A. Gent players
K.M.S.K. Deinze players
FK Smederevo players
Al-Ittihad Club (Tripoli) players
Changsha Ginde players
FK Inđija players
FK Sinđelić Beograd players
Ukrainian Premier League players
Belgian Pro League players
Serbian SuperLiga players
Chinese Super League players
Serbia and Montenegro expatriate footballers
Serbia and Montenegro footballers
Serbian expatriate footballers
Expatriate footballers in Ukraine
Expatriate footballers in Belgium
Expatriate footballers in Libya
Expatriate footballers in China
Serbia and Montenegro expatriate sportspeople in Ukraine
Serbia and Montenegro expatriate sportspeople in Belgium
Serbian expatriate sportspeople in Libya
Serbian expatriate sportspeople in China
Libyan Premier League players